Beor is a village and union council situated in the Kahuta Tehsil of Rawalpindi District, of Punjab, Pakistan. Its geographical coordinates are 33° 35' 0" North, 73° 34' 0" East.

Most of the population is Muslim, and belongs to the Janhal clan which claims to be Mongols & emperor's origin. Beor is at the centre of a cluster of villages inhabited by the Janhal tribe.

See also 

 Kahuta Tehsil

References

Populated places in Kahuta Tehsil
Union councils of Kahuta Tehsil